Ulrich "Uli" Forte (born 30 April 1974) is an Italian football coach and former player from Switzerland.

Personal life
Forte was born in Zürich to a family originally from Salerno, Italy.

Career

As a player
As an active player, he played for FC Brüttisellen-Dietlikon, FC Red Star Zürich and SC Kriens.

As a manager
In 2001, he was a player-coach at FC Red Star Zürich. In 2006, he moved to FC Wil 1900. After coaching FC Wil 1900 for two years, he signed for FC St. Gallen. He was fired on 1 March 2011. One year later, on 16 April 2012, he signed as the new manager of Grasshopper Club Zürich. From July 2013 until August 2015 he was the head coach of BSC Young Boys. On 13 May 2016 he signed as the head coach of FC Zürich.

On 10 August 2021, he was hired by Yverdon-Sport. After one season, he was appointed by Arminia Bielefeld. On 17 August 2022, Forte was sacked after four losses in the new season.

References

1974 births
Living people
Swiss men's footballers
SC Kriens players
FC St. Gallen managers
Grasshopper Club Zürich managers
BSC Young Boys managers
FC Zürich managers
Yverdon-Sport FC managers
Arminia Bielefeld managers
People from Uster District
Swiss people of Italian descent
Association football central defenders
Swiss football managers
Swiss Super League managers
Swiss Challenge League managers
Sportspeople from the canton of Zürich
Bundesliga managers
2. Bundesliga managers